Buddon railway station served the Barry Buddon Training Area from 1910 to 1957 on the Dundee and Arbroath Railway.

History 
The station opened in July 1910, although there is evidence of it being used earlier by military personnel only. To the south was Buddon Siding. The signal box, which opened in 1907, was on the westbound platform. The station closed to the public on 1 September 1914 but the military later used it in 1939, 1944, 1956 and 1957 for special purposes.

References

External links 

Disused railway stations in Angus, Scotland
Railway stations in Great Britain opened in 1910
Railway stations in Great Britain closed in 1914
1910 establishments in Scotland
Former Dundee and Arbroath Railway stations